Alberto Rojas (born January 5, 1965) is a Mexican prelate of the Roman Catholic Church who has been serving as bishop of the Diocese of San Bernardino in Southern California since 2020.  He previously served as an auxiliary bishop of the Archdiocese of Chicago in Illinois from 2011 to 2019.

Biography

Early life 
Alberto Rojas was born on January 5, 1965, in Aguascalientes, Mexico, and attended elementary, secondary schools and college there. He entered the Santa Maria de Guadalupe Seminary in Aguascalientes, then went to the United States to earn his Masters of Divinity from the Mundelein Seminary in Mundelein, Illinois, in 1997.

Priesthood 
Rojas was ordained on May 25, 1997, as a priest of the Archdiocese of Chicago by Cardinal Francis George. After his ordination, Rojas served as associate pastor of St. Gregory the Great Parish (1997–1999) and St. Ita Parish (1999–2002), both in Chicago. From 2002 to 2009, he taught at Mundelein Seminary. From 2010 to 2011 Rojas served as pastor of Good Shepherd Parish in Chicago.

Auxiliary Bishop of Chicago

On June 13, 2011, Rojas was appointed as an auxiliary bishop of the Archdiocese of Chicago and titular bishop of Marazanae by Pope Benedict XVI. He received his episcopal consecration on August 10, 2011, from Cardinal George with Bishop Józek Guzdek and Archbishop Gustavo Garcia-Siller as co-consecrators. While an auxiliary bishop, Rojas also served as episcopal vicar for Vicariate III.

Bishop of San Bernardino

On December 2, 2019, Rojas was appointed as coadjutor bishop of the Diocese of San Bernardino by Pope Francis. Rojas succeeded as bishop of San Bernardino on December 28, 2020.

See also

 Catholic Church hierarchy
 Catholic Church in the United States
 Historical list of the Catholic bishops of the United States
 List of Catholic bishops of the United States
 Lists of patriarchs, archbishops, and bishops

References

External links

 Roman Catholic Diocese of San Bernardino  
 Roman Catholic Archdiocese of Chicago
 

1965 births
Living people
Mexican Roman Catholic priests
University of Saint Mary of the Lake alumni
Roman Catholic Archdiocese of Chicago
Christianity in Chicago
People from Aguascalientes
21st-century Roman Catholic bishops in the United States
Roman Catholic bishops in Illinois